Colbu River may refer to the following rivers in Romania:

 Colbu - tributary of the Băița